R.I.F. is a 2011 French crime film directed by Franck Mancuso.

Cast 
 Yvan Attal as Stéphane Monnereau
 Pascal Elbé as Capitaine Bertrand Barthélémy
 Valentina Cervi as Valérie Monnereau
 Armelle Deutsch as Chef Marion Marquand
 Éric Ruf as Jean-Dominique Perrin 
 Pascal Elso as Christian Baumann
  as Richard Jorelle
  as Charlène Riback
 Anne Charrier as Sandra Giuliani
 Mado Maurin as La mère de Jorelle
  as Menghetti
  as Albert Koskas

References

External links 

2011 crime films
2011 films
French crime films
2010s French films